Brandon McDonald Williams (born May 22, 1967) is an American politician and businessman serving as the U.S. representative for New York's 22nd congressional district since 2023.

Early life and career 
Williams was born in Dallas, Texas, and moved to New York in 2010. He earned a Bachelor of Arts degree in liberal arts from Pepperdine University and an MBA from the Wharton School of the University of Pennsylvania.

Williams served in the United States Navy as a nuclear submarine officer and separated as a lieutenant. A businessman, he is the co-founder of CPLANE.ai, a software company based in San Mateo, California.

U.S. House of Representatives

2022 election

On January 14, 2022, incumbent U.S. Representative John Katko announced that he would not seek reelection in 2022, creating a vacancy. But in early 2022, Katko's district, along with multiple other districts in the state, was subject to redistricting. This pushed Katko's district into district 22, then represented by Claudia Tenney, whose district was also redistricted. Tenney ran in her new district and won.

In the general election, Williams narrowly defeated Democratic nominee Francis Conole, a fellow Navy member.

Political positions

Gun rights 
Williams opposes red flag laws, calling them a violation of the Constitution and abuse of government authority.

Personal life 
Williams resides in Sennett, New York, and also owns a bee farm near Skaneateles with his wife, Stephanie.

References

External links
 Congressman Brandon Williams official U.S. House website
 Brandon Williams for Congress

 

|-

1967 births
Living people
New York (state) Republicans
People from Dallas
Pepperdine University alumni
Republican Party members of the United States House of Representatives from New York (state)
Texas Republicans
Wharton School of the University of Pennsylvania alumni